Macedonia attempted to enter the Eurovision Song Contest 1996, the first time the country tried to enter the Eurovision Song Contest. Macedonia selected Kaliopi to represent them in Norway, after winning the national final selection with the song "Samo ti". However, Macedonia was one of seven countries which failed to qualify for the Eurovision final from a pre-qualifying round, so they were not present in Oslo.

Before Eurovision

Skopje Fest 1996 
The final was held on 3 March 1996 at the Makedonska Narodna Theatre in Skopje, hosted by Biljana Debarlieva and Borce Nikolovski. The winner was chosen by a combination of votes from an "expert" jury, radio stations across Macedonia, and the audience in the hall.

At Eurovision 
In 1996, for the only time in Eurovision history, an audio-only qualifying round (from which hosts Norway were exempt) was held on 20 March as 29 countries wished to participate in the final but the European Broadcasting Union had set a limit of 22 (plus Norway). The countries occupying the bottom seven places after the pre-qualifier would be unable to take part in the main contest. Kaliopi was not among those to qualify, placing joint 26th with 14 points and bringing Macedonia's participation in 1996 to a premature end.

Macedonia would eventually debut two years later, in 1998.

Voting

References

1996
Countries in the Eurovision Song Contest 1996
Eurovision